The Australian cricket team toured India from 27 September to 10 November 2008 and played four test matches, for the Border-Gavaskar Trophy. During the second test match in Mohali Sachin Tendulkar became the first person to make 12,000 runs in Test cricket breaking Brian Lara's record of 11,953 runs.
 Sachin described "It is definitely the biggest achievement in 19 years of my career" on the day he achieved the record. India's 320 run victory in the second test match was also their biggest win against Australia in terms of runs, eclipsing the 222-run victory that came in Melbourne in 1977 and their biggest test win ever in terms of runs. In the first innings of the third test match in Delhi, Gautam Gambhir and V. V. S. Laxman became the first Indian players to both score a double century in a test innings. This series also witnessed the last Tests of two Indian cricketers – Anil Kumble and Sourav Ganguly.

Security concerns and controversy before the tour
Before the Australian cricket team was scheduled to tour India and play a series of Test matches, one-day internationals and Twenty20 matches, it was doubtful if the Australian cricket team would tour India after the terror attacks in Delhi and the press briefing given by India's National Security Advisor M. K. Narayan that raised issues of security concern in the minds of Australia's cricketers.

On 13 September 2008, serial bomb blasts took place in India's capital city Delhi in which 30 people died and over 100 people were injured. The very next day after the blasts, Cricket Australia (CA) issued a statement saying that it would review the security situation in the wake of the blasts and make its decision the next week after performing a risk assessment. The Board of Control for Cricket in India, however, asserted that the blast would have no bearing on the cricket tour which would go ahead as scheduled. However, a conflicting report made on 15 September claimed that the CA had briefed that the tour was on track. Following these reports, the Pakistan Cricket Board (PCB) lashed at the Australian cricket establishment for agreeing to tour India while postponing their tour to Pakistan in early 2008 and accused the Board of adopting double standards. One PCB official even called the Australians "lilly-livered cowards" But Ricky Ponting issued a statement vindicating CA's stand by saying that the circumstances accompanying the cancellation of Australia's tour of Pakistan were entirely different. before adding on 17 September that the tour was not confirmed yet and that it could go either way.

Squads

Tour matches

Two-day: Rajasthan Cricket Association XI v Australians

Four-day: Indian Board President's XI v Australians

Test series

1st Test

Australia batted first and centuries from Ricky Ponting and Michael Hussey makes them put a score of 430 Indian pacer Zaheer Khan took five wickets. India reply with 360 with half centuries from Zaheer Khan and Harbhajan Singh . Australia declared their second innings at 228/6 setting up India a target of 299 in the final day of play and India batsmen played carefully to end the match to draw.    
         
Zaheer Khan was awarded Man Of the Match for his all-round performance in the match.

2nd Test

Prior to the Second Test starting on 17 October in Mohali, Australian opening batsman Phil Jaques (who did not play in the opening Test) was sent home after failing to overcome a back injury. He was replaced in the squad by Shaun Marsh, who had opened the batting in the recently concluded One Day Internationals against the West Indies and had been the leading run-scorer in the 2008 Indian Premier League. Victorian fast-bowler Peter Siddle made his international debut, after Stuart Clark injured his elbow. 
Heavy rains interrupted pitch preparations for the Test, and curator Daljit Singh said, "Heavy rains came down as recently as 4 October and water, two and a half feet deep, collected on the surface which initially affected our ground preparations." The tourists had never played a Test at the venue; however, Indian batsmen Laxman, Sehwag, Dravid, Ganguly and Tendulkar all averaged over 50 at the Punjab Cricket Association Stadium.

Winning the toss and batting, India reached 5/311 by stumps on the opening day, and despite the rain, the pitch was flat with "hardly any swing or movement", enabling the batsmen to hit through the line of the ball. During the day, Sachin Tendulkar became Test cricket's highest run-scorer when he steered a Siddle delivery down to third-man for three. He overtook former West Indian batsman Brian Lara's previous record of 11,953 runs.
However, Australia struggled and managed 268 only after the last three wickets put on more than 100. India dominated for the rest of this match and Australia could barely keep up in this record-setting match.

3rd Test

India batted for almost two days to set themselves up in a dominant position. However the Australians were able to bat for another two days and save the test. The Indians declared late on the final day to give the retiring Anil Kumble a few final overs.

4th Test

This game see-sawed throughout and going into the final day Australia were chasing a large target for victory, however in spite of some good early batting from Matthew Hayden amongst others, the target and the fifth day pitch proved too much for the Australians. The match also saw some unusual (and controversial) tactics on the fourth day by the Australians. Following the Tea Break, they were in a dominant position, however they were a long way behind on their over rate. So to prevent a one match suspension to captain Ricky Ponting, they chose to bowl their part-time bowlers such as Michael Clarke and Mike Hussey (who were both unsuccessful in capturing a wicket), to make it up. This drew strong criticism from many commentators, who suggested that their faster bowlers could have bowled from a shorter run-up. This was also the last test match for Sourav Ganguly.
 Man of the Series – Ishant Sharma – equal top-wicket taker (with Harbhajan Singh) 15 wickets

See also
Ricky Ponting with the Australian cricket team in India in 2008-09

References

2008-09
Indian cricket seasons from 2000–01
2008 in Australian cricket
2008 in Indian cricket
International cricket competitions in 2008–09